Abrasion may refer to:

 Abrasion (dental), the loss of tooth structure by mechanical forces from a foreign element
 Abrasion (medical), a wound consisting of superficial damage to the skin
 Abrasion (mechanical), the process of scuffing, scratching, wearing down, marring, or rubbing away
 Abrasion (geology), mechanical scraping of a surface by friction between moving particles

See also
 Abrasion coast, a coastline that is characterised by the removal (abrasion) of material
 Abrasives